Saud Habib (born January 4, 1979, in Kuwait City) is a Kuwaiti sport shooter. He represented his nation Kuwait in two editions of the Olympic Games (2000 and 2016), and also won a bronze medal in men's skeet shooting at the 2000 ISSF World Cup meet in New Delhi, India. Habib is also a member of the Kuwait City Shooting Club, where he trains full-time under Czech-born coach and 2000 Olympic silver medalist Petr Málek.

Career
Habib made his Olympic debut for Kuwait in shooting at the 2000 Summer Olympics. There, he tallied 117 clay pigeons out of a possible 125 to share a thirty-fifth place tie with three other shooters in the men's skeet.

Sixteen years after his Olympic debut, Habib qualified for his second Kuwaiti team, as a 37-year-old and a member of the Independent Olympic Participants, at the 2016 Summer Olympics in Rio de Janeiro. Despite his defeat 12–13 to United Arab Emirates' Saif bin Futtais in the gold medal match, he consoled himself with a minimum qualifying score of 121 and the first of four available slots at the 2016 Asian Olympic Qualifying Tournament in New Delhi, India.

References

External links

1979 births
Living people
Kuwaiti male sport shooters
Olympic shooters of Kuwait
Shooters at the 2000 Summer Olympics
Shooters at the 2016 Summer Olympics
Shooters at the 2014 Asian Games
Sportspeople from Kuwait City
Olympic shooters as Independent Olympic Participants
Asian Games medalists in shooting
Asian Games silver medalists for Kuwait
Medalists at the 2014 Asian Games